Charles W. Johnson (born 1951) is an American jurist and current Associate Chief Justice of the Washington State Supreme Court of the State of Washington, United States.  He was born in Tacoma, Washington, and resides in Gig Harbor, Washington.

Tenure on the court
Justice Johnson has served on the Washington Supreme Court longer than any other current Justice.  He was first elected to the Washington Supreme Court in 1990, gaining re-election in 1996, 2002, and 2008.  He was re-elected again in 2014 and 2020 and his currently serving his sixth term, which will run until 2027.

In October 2018, Johnson wrote a concurrence when the majority abolished the state's death penalty because they found its racially biased imposition violated the Constitution of Washington.

Education
Justice Johnson graduated from the University of Puget Sound School of Law (now Seattle University School of Law) in 1976, and was the first graduate of that institution to be elected to the Washington Supreme Court.  He took his undergraduate degree from the University of Washington in 1974.  He is a graduate of Curtis High School in University Place, Washington.

References

External links
Biography - Washington Courts

1951 births
Living people
People from Gig Harbor, Washington
Politicians from Tacoma, Washington
University of Puget Sound alumni
Seattle University School of Law alumni
University of Washington alumni
Justices of the Washington Supreme Court
Washington (state) state court judges
20th-century American judges
21st-century American judges